Entertainment management is a relatively new business management discipline that is increasingly being taught as a Bachelor of Science degree. Entertainment management courses aim to provide graduates with appropriate knowledge and skills to progress into management careers within the entertainment sector, managing aspiring and established artists and entertainers, as well as facilities such as sport events, theme parks, theaters, cinemas, live music venues, museums, art galleries, broadcast media companies and night clubs.

The Lubin School of Business at Pace University offers a BBA degree in management with a concentration in arts and entertainment.

A number of master's-level programs have emerged recently, including Carnegie Mellon University's Master of Entertainment Industry Management – which offers students with undergraduate degrees in the film and television the opportunity to refocus their education on the management dimension of the work, or Northwestern University's Master of Science in Leadership for Creative Enterprises program, which offers students with backgrounds in visual, performing, or interactive arts with management and entrepreneurial skills.

Growth in these courses has been linked with growth in both the creative and cultural industries. This growth is linked to increased consumer expenditure on recreation and entertainment activities. The result is a population assigning greater importance to the free time they have and a consequential willingness to spend more of their income on the 'experience' economy.

References

Management by type
Entertainment